Synergy Group Corp. is a South American conglomerate created and owned by Germán Efromovich. The group is headquartered in Rio de Janeiro, Brazil. It operates several airlines in South America, among which are Avianca Group (formerly Avianca Holdings & AviancaTaca Holding), with a 66.66% stake, and is active in the exploration of oil and natural gas throughout the region. Additionally, it operates hydroelectric power plants, participates in the construction of telecommunications infrastructure, shipbuilding and technical inspections, radiochemistry, radiopharmaceuticals, agriculture and hospitality.

Synergy Group had integrated the airlines and companies of TACA Airlines with Avianca under a holding company, Avianca Holdings. The Synergy Group owns 66.66% of the newly created subsidiary company. Kingsland Holding (El Salvador) owns the other 33.33% of Avianca-TACA.

Synergy Aerospace Corp. a sub-division of Synergy Group, is headquartered in Bogota, Colombia. It is the major shareholder of Avianca Holdings. The company controls eight airlines in four countries: Avianca and Tampa Cargo in Colombia, Avianca Brasil, VarigLog and Synerjet in Brazil, VIP and AeroGal in Ecuador and Grupo TACA in El Salvador. In November 2012, Synergy Aerospace Corp. established Synergy Aerospace Europe.

Synergy Aerospace established a joint venture in March 2011, with Israel Aerospace Industries. Brazil-based company EAE Aerospace Solutions was established to become the shareholder and holding company of the group’s activities in Brazil. Synergy wants to invest in Flight Technologies, a manufacturer of tactical UAVs for the Brazilian Army, based in São José dos Campos. The joint venture will offer advanced defense systems, such as unmanned aerial vehicles, Multi Mission Transporters, mission and fighter aircraft upgrades, intelligence surveillance and reconnaissance advanced systems and radars.

The Synergy Group also has relevant activities, including the control of the EISA Shipping Agency, currently building a 500-ton patrol ship for the Brazilian Navy, and the Brazilian Digex company, operating in aircraft maintenance area.

Synergy Aerospace was a candidate in the acquisition of Portuguese state carrier TAP Portugal. In November 2012, Synergy Group created Synergy Europe based in Luxembourg, to deal with the possible takeover of the Portuguese airline. All European activities would be handled by its European subsidiary. Through this unit, the company was planning to partner with European investors, including Portuguese airline EuroAtlantic Airways. In June 2015, Synergy lost the bid to the Gateway consortium, that includes Portuguese bus owner Humberto Pedrosa and Brazilian David Neeleman (Azul Brazilian Airlines).

Subsidiaries
AEQ Aeroespacial
Digex Aircraft Maintenance S.A.
EAE Aerospace Solutions
EISA Shipping Agency
REM
Senior Taxi Aéreo
Synergy Aerospace
Avianca Group
Synergy Europe
Synerjet Brasil

See also
List of Firms with IATA coded air carrier business holdings or subsidiaries in South America

References

External links
Website Synergy Group
CAPA - Centre for Aviation: TAP Portugal’s privatisation enters final stage, with Avianca-TACA parent emerging as only bidder
Edvaldo Pereira Lima, "Avianca Aims for Latin Leadership", Air Transport World, June 2005
 Ecopetrol interview with Synergy Group head German Efromovich, May-June 2005
El Espectador newspaper in Colombia avianca-se-integra-taca 
EISA Shipyard website

Avianca
Conglomerate companies of Brazil
Companies based in Rio de Janeiro (state)
Oil and gas companies of Brazil
Oil and gas companies of Colombia
Airlines of Brazil
Brazilian brands